Rubus eggersii is a Caribbean species of brambles in the rose family. It has been found only in the Dominican Republic.

Rubus eggersii is a reclining perennial with curved prickles. Leaves are compound with 3 leaflets. Flowers are white. Fruits are black.

References

External links

eggersii
Endemic flora of the Dominican Republic
Plants described in 1890